This list of tallest buildings in Perth ranks skyscrapers in the Australian city of Perth by height to the highest architectural detail. This ranking system, created by the U.S.-based Council on Tall Buildings and Urban Habitat includes the height to a spire but not to an antenna. It also stands as the tallest building in the state of Western Australia.
Perth has the fifth-greatest number of skyscrapers of any Australian city, after Melbourne, Sydney, Brisbane, and the Gold Coast.

Tallest buildings 100m+ (328ft+)

Under construction, approved or proposed
This is a list of the tallest buildings under construction, approved or proposed that are planned to be taller than 100 metres.

See also 

List of tallest buildings in Australia
List of tallest buildings in Oceania

References

External links

 Emporis.com (General database of skyscrapers)
 SkyscraperPage (Diagrams and details of buildings)
 Ritz-Carlton returns to Australia with landmark Perth hotel



 
Perth, Western Australia
Tallest